Parumala is a small village and island on the Pampa River in Thiruvalla Taluk ,Pathanamthitta district in Kerala, India.It Is Part Of Thiruvalla Sub-District & Thiruvalla Constituency.

Parumala is the site of the Tomb of St. Gregorios (Parumala Thirumeni) of the Malankara Orthodox Syrian Church, and an annual feast, Ormapperunnal, is held at the Parumala Church on the first and second of November. The nearest town with a railway station is Tiruvalla, 11 kilometers away. The nearest airport is Trivandrum International airport, 124 kilometers away.

See also 

 Gheevarghese Mar Gregorios of Parumala
 Parumala Seminary
 Parumala Church
 Parumala Valiya Panayannarkavu Devi Temple

References 

https://www.keralatourism.org/destination/parumala-church-thiruvalla/45

External links 

Official Site for Parumala Church
Complete Site for Parumala Church

Cities and towns in Pathanamthitta district
Islands of Kerala
River islands of India
Villages in Thiruvalla taluk
Pamba River
Islands of India
Populated places in India